Marinus van der Goes van Naters (21 December 1900 – 12 February 2005) was a Dutch politician of the defunct Social Democratic Workers' Party (SDAP) and later the Labour Party (PvdA) and lawyer.

Background and early career
He was born in Nijmegen. He was a member of the House of Representatives from 1937 to 1967 and in-parliament chairman of the Social Democratic parties SDAP and its successor the Dutch Labour Party from 1945 to 1951.

Imprisonment at Buchenwald and elsewhere
From 1940 to 1944 during World War II he was held hostage by the German occupiers in various camps, including Buchenwald concentration camp.

German border issues after WW2
In the mid-1950s he was involved in the eponymous plan adopted by the Council of Europe for the settlement of the Saar question. In the post-war years he successfully argued that the Duivelsberg (German: Wylerberg or Teufelsberg), annexed from Germany after World War II, be retained permanently by the Netherlands.

Death
He died in 2005 at the age of 104 in Wassenaar, Netherlands.

Decorations

See also

 Wyler, North Rhine-Westphalia#Proximity of Wylerberg

References

External links

Official
  Jhr.Mr.Dr. M. (Marinus) van der Goes van Naters Parlement & Politiek

1900 births
2005 deaths
Buchenwald concentration camp survivors
Commanders of the Order of Orange-Nassau
Dutch centenarians
Dutch conservationists
Dutch expatriates in Rwanda
Dutch jurists
Dutch legal scholars
Dutch legal writers
Dutch members of the Dutch Reformed Church
Dutch nature writers
Dutch people of World War II
Dutch political activists
Dutch political writers
Dutch political party founders
Dutch prisoners of war in World War II
Jonkheers of the Netherlands
Knights of the Order of the Netherlands Lion
Labour Party (Netherlands) MEPs
Labour Party (Netherlands) politicians
Leiden University alumni
Members of the House of Representatives (Netherlands)
MEPs for the Netherlands 1958–1979
World War II prisoners of war held by Germany
World War II civilian prisoners
People from Heerlen
People from Nijmegen
Protestant Church Christians from the Netherlands
Social Democratic Workers' Party (Netherlands) politicians
Academic staff of the University of Rwanda
20th-century Dutch educators
20th-century Dutch lawyers
20th-century Dutch male writers
20th-century Dutch politicians
Men centenarians